Soberg, Søberg or Södberg may refer too:

Patronyme
Carola Söberg (born in 1982), Swedish football player
Markus Søberg (born in 1995), Norwegian ice hockey player
Matthew Søberg Shugart, American political scientist
Steffen Søberg (born in 1993), Norwegian ice hockey player

Place
Søberg, Norway